Fireside Sing Along with Mitch is an album by Mitch Miller and The Gang. It was released in 1959 on the Columbia label (catalog nos. CL-1389 and CS-8184). The album debuted on Billboard magazine's popular albums chart on January 4, 1960, peaked at No. 10, and remained on that chart for 30 weeks.

Track listing
Side 1
 Medley: "Polly Wolly Doodle", "Wait for the Wagon", and "The Old Grey Mare"
 "Funiculi, Funicula"
 Medley: "Drink to Me Only with Thine Eyes" and "Vive L'Amour"
 "Drunk Last Night"
 Medley: "Oh Dear, What Can the Matter Be" and "Oh Where, Oh Where Has My Little Dog Gone"
 "My Bonnie Lies Over the Ocean"

Side 2
 "Love's Old Sweet Song"
 Medley: "Juanita" and "Sweet Genevieve"
 Medley: "Believe Me if All Those Endearing Young Charms" and "In the Gloaming"
 Medley: "Sweet and Low" and "All Through the Night"
 "When You and I Were Young, Maggie"
 Medley: "Annie Laurie" and "Auld Lang Syne"

References

1959 albums
Columbia Records albums
Mitch Miller albums